Manuran de Silva (born 30 October 1992) is a Sri Lankan cricketer. He made his first-class debut for Nondescripts Cricket Club in the 2018–19 Premier League Tournament on 24 January 2019.

References

External links
 

1992 births
Living people
Sri Lankan cricketers
Nondescripts Cricket Club cricketers
Place of birth missing (living people)